The Universal Camouflage Pattern (UCP) is a digital military camouflage pattern formerly used by the United States Army in their Army Combat Uniform.  Technicians at Natick Soldier Systems Center attempted to devise a uniform pattern that would mask the wearer in all seasonal environments.  Laboratory and field tests from 2003 to 2004 showed a pattern named All-Over-Brush (MultiCam Contractor Developed Mod) to provide the best concealment of the patterns tested. All-Over-Brush was selected as the winner over ten other patterns, It was observed at the time that the universal disadvantage of an all-in-one pattern meant compromise and lowered effectiveness in all environments versus a more effective coloration for each environment. Further, the winning All-Over-Brush pattern was not in fact chosen as the final UCP.  Instead, U.S. Army leadership utilized pixellated images taken from Canadian CADPAT and US Marine Corps MARPAT, then recolored them based on three universal colors developed in the Army's 2002-2004 tests, to be called the UCP. While the pixelated pattern of the UCP is similar to the MARPAT and CADPAT camouflage patterns used by the United States Marine Corps and the Canadian Armed Forces, its coloration differs significantly.  The final UCP was then adopted without field testing against other patterns.  

Soldiers serving in Iraq and Afghanistan questioned the effectiveness of the UCP in concealing them from enemy observation, and that the uniform was in fact endangering their missions and their lives.  In response, the US Army conducted several studies to find a modification or replacement for the standard issue pattern. In July 2014, the Army announced that Operational Camouflage Pattern would replace all UCP-patterned ACU uniforms by the end of September 2019. However, UCP does remain in service in limited capacities, such as on some cold weather overgear and older body armor.

Additionally, after having used the OCP for several years as their own deployment uniform, the United States Air Force also decided to adopt the OCP as their sole utility uniform for all airmen, both in-garrison and deployed, to replace their current pixelated utility uniform, the Airman Battle Uniform, which was similar in appearance to UCP.  The wear-out date for the Air Force ABU was 1 April 2021.

Selection

Phase I

Initial patterns and colors

Three patterns were developed, called All Over Brush, Track, and Shadow/Line. For each pattern, there were four color combinations, which corresponded to a specific type of terrain, however, all four patterns used tan as their base color. The three remaining colors were green, brown, and black for the Woodland pattern, dark tan, khaki, and brown for the Desert pattern, light gray, medium gray, and black for the Urban pattern, and dark tan, light gray, and brown for the Desert/Urban pattern.

Test sites
There were fifteen evaluations, which took place at Fort Benning, Fort Polk, Fort Irwin, Fort Lewis, and Yakima, Washington. The camouflage patterns were then rated on their blending, brightness, contrast, and detection by U.S. Army soldiers, during the daytime, and also at night using night vision devices.

Elimination of patterns
Following testing, the Shadow Line pattern was eliminated entirely, along with the urban and desert/urban patterns of All Over Brush. All four of the Track patterns were accepted along with All Over Brush's woodland and desert patterns.

Phases II and III
The patterns were then modified and tested alongside a newly introduced "Contractor-Developed Mod" pattern, MultiCam. Near infrared testing determined that black, medium gray, and medium tan were the only colors that gave acceptable performance.

Phase IV (system level)
All four remaining patterns, desert Brush, MultiCam, Woodland Track, and Urban Track were then tested alongside each other in urban, woodland, and desert environments.

Results
The desert Brush design received the best overall mean daytime visual rating. Contractor developed pattern received highest rating in woodland environments, but low ratings in desert and urban environments. Urban Track was generally the 3rd or 4th worst performer at each site, but was the best performer in nighttime environments. Infrared testing showed negligible differences in the performance of the four patterns. Natick rated the patterns from best to worst as: Desert Brush, Woodland Track Mod, Contractor-Developed Mod, and Urban Track.

Color selection
The color scheme of the Army Combat Uniform is composed of tan (officially named Desert Sand 500), gray (Urban Gray 501), and sage green (Foliage Green 502). The pattern is notable for its elimination of the color black. Justification given for the omission of black was that black is a color not commonly found in nature. Pure black viewed through night vision goggles can appear extremely dark and create an undesirable high-contrast image.

Controversy

The U.S. Army incorrectly reported to the media that the basis for the UCP was the Urban Track pattern, which had been modified through the removal of black from the pattern and pixelated. Pattern comparisons subsequently established that the information provided by the U.S. Army was incorrect, and that the pattern was simply a three-colored version of MARPAT, a derivative of the Canadian CADPAT scheme. No evidence has been presented by the U.S. Army that the new UCP pattern had undergone proper field testing.  

Following building criticism of the poor effectiveness of the pattern in most terrains like the Afghan and Middle Eastern theatres of operations, the use of the pattern was discussed within the U.S. Senate.

When passed by the Senate, House of Representatives Bill 2346 required the Department of Defense to "take immediate action to provide combat uniforms to personnel deployed to Afghanistan with a camouflage pattern that is suited to the environment of Afghanistan."  The Army subsequently initiated re-evaluation of existing and alternative camouflage patterns to determine if this was a necessary action. In tests conducted by the U.S. Army's Natick Soldier Systems Center (NSRDEC), results indicated that three other patterns did significantly better than UCP in desert and woodland environments. Four commercial submissions were tested to replace UCP for Army use.

Discontinuation and replacement

In 2014, the United States Army discontinued the Universal Camouflage Pattern, and Army researchers worked on a new and better camouflage. Four new patterns were tested to give soldiers different patterns suitable for different environments, plus a single neutral pattern, to be used on more expensive body armor and other gear.

The selection involved hundreds of computer trials as well as on-the-ground testing at half a dozen locations around the world. In May 2014, the Army announced that a pattern called Scorpion, a pattern similar to MultiCam that was developed for the Objective Force Warrior program in 2002 and modified in 2009 (W2 version), had been chosen as the replacement for UCP. On 31 July 2014, the Army formally announced that the Operational Camouflage Pattern would begin being issued on uniforms in summer 2015.

The name Operational Camouflage Pattern is to emphasize its use beyond Afghanistan to all combatant commands, with a family of versions, including a dark jungle-woodland variant and a lighter pattern for deserts. The Universal Camouflage Pattern was discontinued by the Army at the end of September 2019 for uniforms, though still sees some limited usage on other gear such as some body armor and cold weather overgear. As the military began phasing out the UCP, many state defense forces began adopting it as their uniform.

Users

Current
 : Used by the Azeri Ministry of Interior's Kobra Special Group.
 
 : UCP clones used by some Chadian commando units and by Chadian Gendarmerie anti-poaching units.
 
 : Used by Cypriot special forces.
 : Used by Counter-Terrorism Center operators.
 : Used for urban operations only by MARCOS commandos and Paras. The Indian Air Force adopted a similar pattern in 2022.
 : UCP clones used by the Islamic Republic of Iran Navy Marine Command and some Basiji special operations forces.
 : Used By Almost all branches of the Kazakh ground forces. Their Version of UCP is similar to UCP-D but with a light green inlay instead of a Brown one. Called "KazTcifra" it makes not just an interesting blend for the wearer but also actually manages to fit the terrain well.
 : Lebanese Marine Commandos use both local copies and surplus UCP ACU uniforms from U.S. Army.
 : Supplied and used by the Special Task and Rescue unit.
 : Used by the Montenegrin Special Anti-Terrorist Unit.
 : Known to be used by operators of the Posebna Jedinica Policije.
 
 : Used by Royal Saudi Air Force personnel, which has a darker color palette.
 : Used by the Serbian Special Anti–Terrorist Unit only in operations inside cities/towns with UCP-patterned BDUs. Also used by the Gendarmery.
 : Used by regular Ukrainian Armed Forces (slightly different color palette), and some special units.

Former
 : Worn by KATUSA units. 
 : Former standard camouflage of the U.S. Army from 2005 to 2019. 
: Vests, webbing, gear and helmet covers in use for training reserves.
: Utilised helmet covers, vests, armor, webbing and gear from U.S. Army to collaborate with former Airman Battle Uniform.
: Uniforms and equipment utilised by Navy individual augmentees attached with Army units.

Notes

References

Bibliography

External links
 Army testing combat boots, camouflage patterns

Camouflage patterns
Military camouflage
Military equipment introduced in the 2000s